The category of newly industrialized country (NIC), newly industrialized economy (NIE) or middle income country is a socioeconomic classification applied to several countries around the world by political scientists and economists. They represent a subset of developing countries whose economic growth is much higher than other developing countries; and where the social consequences of industrialization, such as urbanization, are reorganizing society.

Definition 
NICs are countries whose economies have not yet reached a developed country's status but have, in a macroeconomic sense, outpaced their developing counterparts. Such countries are still considered developing nations and only differ from other developing nations in the rate at which an NIC's growth is much higher over a shorter allotted time period compared to other developing nations. Another characterization of NICs is that of countries undergoing rapid economic growth (usually export-oriented). Incipient or ongoing industrialization is an important indicator of an NIC.

Characteristics of newly industrialized countries 
Newly industrialized countries can bring about an increase of stabilization in a country's social and economic status, allowing the people living in these nations to begin to experience better living conditions and better lifestyles. Another characteristic that appears in newly industrialized countries is the further development in government structures, such as democracy, the rule of law, and less corruption. Other such examples of a better lifestyle people living in such countries can experience are better transportation, electricity, and better access to water, compared to other developing countries and low infant mortality rate.

Historical context 
The term came into use around 1970, when the Four Asian Tigers of Taiwan, Singapore, Hong Kong and South Korea rose to become globally competitive in science, technological innovation and economic prosperity as well as NICs in the 1970s and 1980s, with exceptionally fast industrial growth since the 1960s; all four countries having since graduated into high-tech industrialized developed countries with wealthy high-income economies. There is a clear distinction between these countries and the countries now considered NICs. In particular, the combination of an open political process, high GNI per capita, and a thriving, export-oriented economic policy has shown that these East Asian economic tiger countries have roughly come to a match with developed countries as those of Western Europe as well Canada, Japan, Australia, New Zealand and the United States.

All four countries are classified as high-income economies by the World Bank and developed countries by the International Monetary Fund (IMF) and U.S. Central Intelligence Agency (CIA). All of the Four Asian Tigers, like Western European countries, have a Human Development Index considered "very high" by the United Nations.

Current 
The table below presents the list of countries consistently considered NICs by different authors and experts. Turkey, Brazil and Malaysia are classified as developed countries by the CIA. Turkey was a founding member of the OECD in 1961 and Mexico joined in 1994. The G8+5 group is composed of the original G8 members in addition to China, India, Mexico, South Africa and Brazil.

Note: Green-colored cells indicate highest value or best performance in index, while yellow-colored cells indicate the opposite.

For China and India, the immense population of these two countries (each with over 1.3 billion people as of May 2021) means that per capita income will remain low even if either economy surpasses that of the United States in overall GDP. When GDP per capita is calculated according to purchasing power parity (PPP), this takes into account the lower costs of living in each newly industrialized country. GDP per capita typically is an indicator for living standards in a given country as well.

Brazil, China, India, Mexico and South Africa meet annually with the G8 countries to discuss financial topics and climate change, due to their economic importance in today's global market and environmental impact, in a group known as G8+5.

Other 
Authors set lists of countries accordingly to different methods of economic analysis. Sometimes a work ascribes NIC status to a country that other authors don't consider a NIC. This is the case of countries such as Argentina, Egypt, Sri Lanka and Russia.

Criticism 
NICs usually benefit from comparatively low wage costs, which translates into lower input prices for suppliers. As a result, it is often easier for producers in NICs to outperform and outproduce factories in developed countries, where the cost of living is higher, and trade unions and other organizations have more political sway. This comparative advantage is often criticized by advocates of the fair trade movement.

Problems 
While South Africa is considered wealthy on a wealth-per-capita basis, economic inequality is persistent and extreme poverty remains high in the country.

Mexico's economic growth is hampered in some areas by an ongoing drug war.

Other NICs face common problems such as widespread corruption and political instability, as well as other circumstances that cause them to face the middle income trap.

See also 

 Emerging market
 Flying geese paradigm
 Global North and Global South
 Industrialisation
 Mechanization
 Mass production
 Science in newly industrialized countries
 Second World

Groupings

 BRIC / MINT / Next Eleven
 BRICS
 CIVETS
 Emerging and growth-leading economies
 G8+5
 G20
 G20 developing nations
 VISTA

References 

Economic country classifications
Industrialisation
International development
Economic development
Industrial history